Espiritu Santo is the largest island in the nation of Vanuatu, with an area of  and a population of around 40,000 according to the 2009 census.

Geography
The island belongs to the archipelago of the New Hebrides in the Pacific region of Melanesia. It is in the Sanma Province of Vanuatu. The town of Luganville, on Espiritu Santo's southeast coast, is Vanuatu's second-largest settlement and the provincial capital. Roads run north and west from Luganville, but most of the island is far from the limited road network. Around Espiritu Santo lie a number of small islands and islets; among them are: Dany Island, Araki, Elephant Island, Sakao, Lataroa, Lataro, Thion, Malohu, Malwepe, Malvapevu, Malparavu, Maltinerava, Oyster Island, Tangoa, and Bokissa.

Vanuatu's highest peak is the 1879 metre (6165 foot) Mount Tabwemasana in west-central Espiritu Santo.

History

A Spanish expedition of three ships, led by Portuguese explorer Pedro Fernandes de Queirós, landed in 1606 at Big Bay on the north side of the island. Queirós named the land La  del Espíritu Santo in acknowledgment of the Spanish king's descent from the royal House of Austria, and believing he had arrived in the Great Southern Continent, Terra Australis. They entered the bay on the 1st and 2 May: the latter being the day of Saints Philip and James, Queirós named it .

The local chief tried to chase the Spanish explorers back to their ships, which led to an exchange of arrows and musket-fire, in which the chief was killed.  The ships remained for a month at their anchorage "", with armed sailors making incursions inland for provisions.  Queirós announced his intention to found a city, Nova Jerusalem, and appointed municipal officers.  In early June, with provisions running low, they left the bay to explore the neighbouring coastline. Queirós' lead ship became separated, and, whether through adverse weather or mutiny, was unable to make anchor in the bay.

The  (second-in-command, and captain of the second ship), Luis Váez de Torres, searched the coast for signs of shipwreck but found none. He remained until late June, then sailed to the west coast with the intention of circumnavigating what he considered to be an island, not a continent.  The wind and current were against this aim, so he left the island sailing west, eventually encountering the previously unexplored southern coast of New Guinea. Torres then discovered the strait that bears his name between northern Australia and southern New Guinea.

After the departure of Queirós and Torres, the Espiritu Santo was not visited again by Europeans until 160 years later, by Louis de Bougainville in 1768 and James Cook in 1774.

During the time of the British–French Condominium, Hog Harbour, on the northeast coast, was the site of the British district administration, while Segond, near Luganville, was the French district administration.

World War II 

During World War II, particularly after the Japanese attack on Pearl Harbor, the island was used by American naval and air forces as a large military supply and support base, naval harbor, and airfield. Luganville Airfield, also called Bomber Field #3, was a large airfield built by the Seabees of the 40th Naval Construction Battalion in  1943. Also built on the island was Bomber Field No.2 which became Santo-Pekoa International Airport after the war. Palikulo Bay Airfield, also called Bomber Field #1, became part of the main road after the war. Luganville Seaplane Base served the seaplane and Turtle Bay Airfield also called Fighter Field #1 served the Fighter planes.

The SS President Coolidge was a converted luxury liner that hit a sea mine during the war and was sunk. The shipwreck off Espiritu Santo later became a popular diving spot. 
The presence of the Americans contributed later to the island's tourism in scuba diving, as the Americans dumped most of their used military and naval equipment, and their refuse, at what is now known as "Million Dollar Point".

In highly fictionalized form, this was the locale of James Michener's Tales of the South Pacific, and of the following Rodgers and Hammerstein musical, South Pacific.

Post-World War II 
Between May and August 1980 the island was the site of a rebellion during the transfer of power over the colonial New Hebrides from the condominium to the independent Vanuatu. Jimmy Stevens' Nagriamel movement, in alliance with private French interests and backed by the Phoenix Foundation and American libertarians hoping to establish a tax-free haven, declared the island of Espiritu Santo to be independent of the new government. The "Republic of Vemerana" was proclaimed on May 28. France recognized the independence on June 3. On June 5, the tribal chiefs of Santo named the French Ambassador Philippe Allonneau the "King of Vemerana", and Jimmy Stevens became the Prime Minister. 
Luganville was renamed Allonneaupolis. Next, negotiations with Port-Vila failed, and from July 27 to August 18, British Royal Marines and a unit of the French Garde Mobile were deployed to Vanuatu's capital island, but they did not enter Espiritu Santo as the soon-to-be government had hoped. The troops were recalled shortly before independence. Following independence, Vanuatu, now governed by Father Walter Lini, requested assistance from Papua New Guinea, whose army invaded and conquered Espiritu Santo, keeping it in Vanuatu.

Culture

Over 30 different local languages are spoken on Espiritu Santo, a subgroup of the North Vanuatu languages. 

Espiritu Santo, with many wrecks and reefs to be explored, is a very popular tourist destination for divers. Champagne Beach draws tourists with its white sand and clear waters. The "Western Side" of the island contains many caves which can be explored, and cruise ships often stop in at Luganville.

The local people make their living by supporting the tourist trade, by cash-crop farming, mostly copra,  but also some cocoa beans and kava, as well as peanuts, or by subsistence farming and fishing.

Most of the people are Christians. The largest church groups on the island are the Presbyterian Church of Vanuatu, the Roman Catholic Church, and the Church of Melanesia (Anglican). Also active are the Apostolic Church, the Church of Christ, the Seventh-day Adventist Church, and others. However, in many villages, particularly in Big Bay and South Santo, the people are "heathen", a term that in Vanuatu has no pejorative connotation — it simply denotes someone who has not embraced Christianity. Customary beliefs of a more modern sort are found among followers of the Nagriamel movement based in Fanafo.

For almost all of Espiritu Santo's people, custom plays a large part in their lives, regardless of their religion. The chief system continues strongly in most areas.

The people of Santo face some health problems, especially malaria and tuberculosis. Although there is a hospital, most local people consult either their own witch doctor or medical clinics set up by western missionaries. Kava is the popular drug of the island, although alcohol is becoming more prevalent. With the rising number of adults using alcohol, there is a rising crime rate, especially involving violence toward women, and tribal warfare.

Sports
In September 1998, Espiritu Santo hosted the Melanesia Cup soccer tournament.

Economy and infrastructure
Luganville is the only true town on the island; the rest of the island is dotted with small villages. From Luganville, three "main roads" emerge. Main Street leaves the town to the west and winds along the south coast of the island for about 40 km ending at the village of Tasiriki on the southwest coast. Canal Road runs along the southern and eastern coasts of the island, north through Hog Harbor and Golden Beach, ending at Port Olry. Big Bay Highway splits off from Canal Road near Turtle Bay on the east coast, runs generally west to the mountains, and then it leads north to Big Bay. The international airport is about five km east of the center of Luganville. Numerous rivers run to the coastline from the mountains of the island. The Sarakata River is the largest one, and it runs through Luganville.

Many people on Espiritu Santo still rely on subsistence farming for their food. The villages on the island are mostly self-sufficient with their own vegetable gardens, chickens, and pigs. Taros and yams are commonly grown in these gardens, and these are mainstays of the local diet.

Espiritu Santo is home to a number of cattle farms (including the famous Belmol Cattle Project, originally established by French settlers), and the island exports much of its beef to Japan, Australia, and other Pacific countries.

Besides beef, tinned fish, and rice bought in town, Espiritu Santo has many foods that locals take for granted, and that tourists enjoy as delicacies. Among these are sweet pineapples, mangoes, island cabbage, flying foxes, and coconut crab, as well as local nuts such as natapoa and the sweet fleshy-fruit nouse. There is a market in Luganville where local food such as manioc, taro, yam, and cabbage; and other freshly grown island staples are sold. Several small supermarkets such as LCM, Unity Shell, and Au bon Marche sell groceries and many packaged goods.

Biodiversity
The island of Espiritu Santo is home to all of Vanuatu's endemic birds, including the Santo mountain starling, a species restricted entirely to Espiritu Santo. Two protected areas have been established to safeguard the island's biodiversity; the Loru Conservation Area on the east coast and the Vatthe Conservation area near Big Bay in the north.

The Loru Rainforest Protected Area is situated in the lowland rainforests of Espiritu Santo. Established in 1993 by Chief Caleb Ser, the 220-hectare reserve supports a rich variety of Vanuatu's bird, bat, and plant life, as well as a diverse range of marine species in the two-kilometre stretch of fringing reef.

See also

Espiritu Santo languages
 Vanuatu Labor Corps

Notes

References

External links

 Espirtu Santo tourism website

 
Islands of Vanuatu
Sanma Province
Former Spanish colonies
Former republics
Former monarchies
Island countries